This is the discography of Japanese pop duo Rythem.

Albums

Studio albums

Compilation albums

DVDs

Singles

Discographies of Japanese artists
Pop music group discographies